Hymenobacter arcticus is a Gram-negative, aerobic, rod-shaped, non-spore-forming and non-motile bacterium from the genus of Hymenobacter which has been isolated from the Han River in Korea.

References

External links
Type strain of Hymenobacter aquaticus at BacDive -  the Bacterial Diversity Metadatabase

aquaticus
Bacteria described in 2017